Trenchia agulhasae is a species of small, deep water sea snail, a marine gastropod mollusk in the family unassigned Seguenzioidea

Subspecies Trenchia agulhasae argentinae (Clarke, 1961)

Distribution
This species was found in the Agulhas Basin.

References

External links
 To World Register of Marine Species
 Clarke, A. H. (1961). Abyssal mollusks from the South Atlantic Ocean. Bulletin of the Museum of Comparative Zoology. 4, 345-387
 McLean J.H. (1992). Systematic review of the family Choristellidae (Archeogastropoda: Lepetellacea) with descriptions of new species. The Veliger 35(4): 273-294

Lepetellidae
Gastropods described in 1961